Alvise De Vidi (born 30 April 1966, in San Biagio di Callalta) is a former paralympic athlete from Italy competing mainly in category T51 wheelchair racing events.

Biography
Alvise has competed in 6 Paralympics across two sports winning 15 medals seven of them gold. His first games were in 1988 Summer Paralympics where he competed in the 25m Butterfly class 1A winning the gold medal, despite winning a gold medal this would prove to be the only time he competed outside of athletics. In the same games he also competed in seven track events ranging from 100m to 1500m including both the relays and it was in the 4 × 100 m that he won a bronze medal. In the 1992 Summer Paralympics he competed in the 100m, 400m, 800m and 1500m winning the bronze in the 800m.

At the 1996 Summer Paralympics proved to be a much more successful year when he won the 400m and 800m gold medals, silver in the 1500m and competed in the marathon. At the 2000 Summer Paralympics he achieved more success with a defence of his 800m gold medal and further gold medals in the 1500m and marathon as well as silver in 400m and bronze in the 200m. 2004 Summer Paralympics were to be his last but he managed to defend his marathon title and win a second consecutive bronze over 200m.

Achievements

See also
Italy at the Paralympics - Multiple medallists

References

External links
 
 Alvise De Vidi at Ability Channel

Living people
1966 births
Paralympic athletes of Italy
Paralympic swimmers of Italy
Swimmers at the 1988 Summer Paralympics
Athletes (track and field) at the 1988 Summer Paralympics
Athletes (track and field) at the 1992 Summer Paralympics
Athletes (track and field) at the 1996 Summer Paralympics
Athletes (track and field) at the 2000 Summer Paralympics
Athletes (track and field) at the 2004 Summer Paralympics
Athletes (track and field) at the 2008 Summer Paralympics
Athletes (track and field) at the 2012 Summer Paralympics
Athletes (track and field) at the 2016 Summer Paralympics
Paralympic gold medalists for Italy
Paralympic silver medalists for Italy
Paralympic bronze medalists for Italy
Medalists at the 1988 Summer Paralympics
Medalists at the 1992 Summer Paralympics
Medalists at the 1996 Summer Paralympics
Medalists at the 2000 Summer Paralympics
Medalists at the 2004 Summer Paralympics
Medalists at the 2012 Summer Paralympics
Medalists at the 2016 Summer Paralympics
Paralympic medalists in athletics (track and field)
Paralympic medalists in swimming
Paralympic athletes of Fiamme Azzurre
Italian wheelchair racers